Miss Venezuela 1961 was the eighth edition of Miss Venezuela pageant held at Tamanaco Intercontinental Hotel in Caracas, Venezuela, on July 1, 1961. The winner of the pageant was Ana Griselda Vegas, Miss Caracas.

That year, Camay Soaps, the most important sponsor of the Miss Venezuela, included in the newspapers coupons to vote for the delegates, which were considered during the event.

Results

Special awards
Miss Fotogénica (Miss Photogenic) - Alba Cárdenas (Miss Táchira)

Delegates

 Miss Amazonas - Flor Núñez
 Miss Anzoátegui - Nélida Ponce
 Miss Apure - Zulema Fernández
 Miss Aragua - Bexi Romero Tosta
 Miss Barinas - Dalia Rosales
 Miss Carabobo - Elizabeth Bello
 Miss Caracas - Ana Griselda Vegas Albornoz
 Miss Departamento Libertador - Gisela Parra Mejías
 Miss Departamento Vargas - Raquel Luy Franklin
 Miss Distrito Federal - Gloria Lilué Chaljub
  Miss Falcón - Yolanda Francisca Sierralta
 Miss Guárico - Cecilia Urbina
 Miss Lara - Elvia Pacheco Vivas
 Miss Mérida - Gloria Parra
 Miss Miranda - Isabel Martínez Toledo
 Miss Portuguesa - Zenaida Hurtado Omaña
 Miss Sucre - Migdalia Quijada Guillén
 Miss Táchira - Alba Cárdenas Gómez
 Miss Trujillo - Sara Porras
 Miss Yaracuy - Maria Margarita Rivas
 Miss Zulia - Norma Nash

External links
Miss Venezuela official website

1961 beauty pageants
1961 in Venezuela